Veshkaymsky District is an administrative and municipal district (raion), one of the twenty-one in Ulyanovsk Oblast, Russia. It is located in the western central part of the oblast. Its administrative center is the urban locality (a work settlement) of Veshkayma. Population: 19,801 (2010 Census);  The population of the administrative center accounts for 33.4% of the district's total population.

References

Notes

Sources

Districts of Ulyanovsk Oblast